The 2011–13 ICC World Cricket League Championship (originally named the Intercontinental Cup One-Day) was the first edition of the ICC World Cricket League Championship, though the competition had been previously run under the name ICC World Cricket League Division One. It ran from June 2011 until October 2013, in parallel with the first-class 2011–13 ICC Intercontinental Cup, and was contested by the same eight associate and affiliate member teams.

Format

The eight qualifiers were the six teams from 2010 ICC World Cricket League Division One:

and the top two teams from 2011 ICC World Cricket League Division Two:

The tournament comprised a round robin format. Matches between teams from Division One had full One-Day International status, while matches featuring one or both of the Division Two teams had List A status.

The top two teams qualified for the 2015 Cricket World Cup, with the remaining six teams entering a further World Cup qualifying tournament to decide the final two World Cup places.

Fixtures
The breakdown of fixtures was as follows: During each round, each team played against their opponent twice.

Points table

Matches

Round 1

Round 2

Round 3

Round 4

Round 5

Round 6

Round 7

Statistics

Most runs
The top five highest run scorers (total runs) are included in this table.

Most wickets
The following table contains the five leading wicket-takers in the tournament.

References

External links
 Tournament website on ESPN Cricinfo
 Schedule

ICC World Cricket League Championship
ICC World Cricket League Championship
ICC World Cricket League Championship
2009–14 ICC World Cricket League